The Americas Zone was one of the three regional zones of the 1982 Davis Cup.

10 teams entered the Americas Zone in total, split across the North & Central America and the South America Zones. The winner of each sub-zone advanced to the Americas Inter-Zonal Final, with the winner promoted to the following year's World Group.

Paraguay defeated Canada in the Americas Inter-Zonal Final and qualified for the 1983 World Group.

Participating nations
North & Central America Zone: 

South America Zone:

North & Central America Zone

Draw

Semifinals

Colombia vs. Caribbean/West Indies

Venezuela vs. Canada

The singles match between Andrew and Fritz set the Davis Cup record for the most games in a singles rubber (100).

Final

Canada vs. Colombia

South America Zone

Draw

Quarterfinals

Bolivia vs. Ecuador

Paraguay vs. Peru

Semifinals

Brazil vs. Ecuador

Uruguay vs. Paraguay

Final

Paraguay vs. Ecuador

Americas Inter-Zonal Final

Canada vs. Paraguay

References

External links
Davis Cup official website

Davis Cup Americas Zone
Americas